Virginia's 35th House of Delegates district elects one of 100 seats in the Virginia House of Delegates, the lower house of the state's bicameral legislature. District 35, in Fairfax County, is currently represented by Democrat Holly Seibold. Democrat Mark Keam, who represented the district since 2010, resigned on September 6, 2022 to take a position in the Biden Administration.

Elections
Keam narrowly defeated James Hyland in 2007. He defeated mechanical engineer Leiann Leppin Luse in 2013. In that election, Luse had run on a platform of cutting taxes and regulations.

District officeholders

References

External links
 

Virginia House of Delegates districts
Government in Fairfax County, Virginia